Emily Leproust is an American scientist and entrepreneur. She is the CEO and co-founder of Twist Bioscience, a public company working on DNA synthesis. The company harnesses synthetic biology, providing tools to manufacture insulin from yeast, to tackle malaria, produce spider silk at scale or store information on DNA. She was awarded the BIO Rosalind Franklin Award in 2020.

Education and career 
Leproust earned an M.Sc. in Industrial Chemistry from the Lyon School of Industrial Chemistry  in 1995 and a PhD in Organic Chemistry & Nucleic Acids Chemistry from the University of Houston in 2001. She worked for the company Agilent where she was Director of Applications and Chemistry R&D—Genomics before starting the company Twist Bioscience.

Leproust participated in a March 2021 tabletop exercise at the Munich Security Conference simulating an outbreak of weaponized monkeypox.

Publications
Gnirke A, Melnikov A, Maguire J, Rogov P, LeProust EM, Brockman W, Fennell T, Giannoukos G, Fisher S, Russ C, Gabriel S. Solution hybrid selection with ultra-long oligonucleotides for massively parallel targeted sequencing. Nature biotechnology. 2009 Feb;27(2):182-9. 
Kaplan N, Moore IK, Fondufe-Mittendorf Y, Gossett AJ, Tillo D, Field Y, LeProust EM, Hughes TR, Lieb JD, Widom J, Segal E. The DNA-encoded nucleosome organization of a eukaryotic genome. Nature. 2009 Mar;458(7236):362-6. 
Goldman N, Bertone P, Chen S, Dessimoz C, LeProust EM, Sipos B, Birney E. Towards practical, high-capacity, low-maintenance information storage in synthesized DNA. Nature. 2013 Feb;494(7435):77-80.

References

External links

American women scientists
Year of birth missing (living people)
Living people
21st-century American women